The Tipton Community School District is a rural public school district located in Tipton, Iowa. It serves 834 students and comprises one elementary school (K-5), one middle school (6-8), and one high school(9-12). Its stated focus is on developing the total student in a full range of academic and extra curricular offerings. The school has a staff of over fifty professional educators whose stated values are education, student achievement, and student growth. Tipton's educational program is anchored by the basics and music, art, and physical education which are all considered essential at every educational level. K-12 special education and Talented and Gifted programs are also available. Media centers and computer labs exist in each attendance center to assist in curriculum delivery. All classrooms are computer and telephone networked with every other school within the district.

History
In 1856, Tipton established the first free public school, including a high school, west of the Mississippi River. In the late 1969s, population growth dictated that a new Tipton School be constructed as a three-story school near the center of the city of Tipton. The school board oversaw six country schoolhouses and by 1925 all country school students had moved into the new building in Tipton. The Tipton School was also among the first to build a gymnasium, swimming pool and auditorium for the use of elementary grades and both junior and senior high school. John Kerry visited Tipton in 2004 and spoke in the Tipton Middle School gymnasium

Schools

Tipton High School

Athletics
Since 2014, the Tigers compete in the River Valley Conference, after the renaming of the Cedar Valley Conference.  The Tigers compete in the following sports:

Baseball
Basketball (boys and girls)
Bowling (boys and girls)
Cross Country (boys and girls)
 Boys' - 1975 State Champions
 Girls' - 7-time State Champions (1989, 1994, 2001, 2003, 2004, 2005, 2006)
Football
Golf (boys and girls)
Soccer (boys and girls)
Softball
Swimming (boys and girls)
Tennis (boys and girls)
Track and Field (boys and girls)
 Boys' - 3-time Class 3A State Champions (1983, 1984, 1985)
 Girls' - 7-time Class 2A State Champions (1988, 1989, 1991, 2004, 2005, 2006, 2007) 
Volleyball
Wrestling

Fine arts

One of the most well-known fine arts programs of THS is the Tipton Concert Choir. They have performed in Washington D.C, Wisconsin, Louisiana, and various locations around Iowa. The Tipton Chamber Choir received a "Best in Center" award in 2005, 2006 and 2007 at the state Solo/Ensemble contest. In the fall of 2006, the THS Chamber Choir was selected to perform for the Iowa Girls State Volleyball Tournament and in the Spring of 2007, the THS Concert Choir performed for the United Nations in New York City. In 2007, the THS Madrigal Choir also received "Best of Center" recognition at the 2A state solo/ensemble contest. Also in May 2009, the Tipton Concert Choir earned a perfect score at Large Group Contest singing Psalmo 150 and Gloria.

Tipton also offers many other fine arts activities such as band, drama and academic decathlon. The University of Iowa Hawkeye Drumline shared a performance on the THS field with the Tiger Band during a 2005 football game. The concert band also continuously earns division I ratings at the State Large Group contest.

Contact information
 400 E 6th St
 Tipton, IA 52772
 563-886-2341
 Cedar County, Iowa

Enrollment

See also
List of school districts in Iowa
List of high schools in Iowa

References

External links
Tipton Community School District: http://www.tipton.k12.ia.us/
Tipton High School Alumni: https://web.archive.org/web/20010306060005/http://www.schwitzer.net/TiptonAlumni.asp (limited)

School districts in Iowa
School districts established in 1856
Education in Cedar County, Iowa
Tipton, Iowa
1856 establishments in Iowa